John Ryder (c. 1697 – 4 February 1775) was the Church of Ireland Bishop of Down and Connor, from 1743 to 1752, and then Archbishop of Tuam, from 1752 to his death in 1775.

Life
The son of Dudley Ryder, haberdasher, he was born at Nuneaton, Warwickshire, about 1697. His grandfather was another Dudley Ryder (died 1683), an ejected rector of Bedworth. He was educated at Charterhouse School and Queens' College, Cambridge, where he graduated BA in 1715, MA in 1719, and DD in 1741.

In 1721 Ryder was appointed as vicar of Nuneaton and held the living until his appointment as Church of Ireland bishop of Killaloe by letters patent of 30 January 1742. He was consecrated in St Bridget's, Dublin, on 21 February. Only a year later he was translated to the see of Down and Connor, and was further promoted, in March 1752, to be archbishop of Tuam and bishop of Ardagh. His views were evangelical.

Ryder spent his later years at Nice, where he died on 4 February 1775 from the effects of a fall from his horse. He was buried on 6 February in a ground near the shore, purchased for Protestant burials by the British consul. The area was later eroded by the sea.

His daughter Catherine married a John Hamilton and, travelling on the Continent, met and became a dear friend of Yekaterina Romanovna Vorontsova-Dashkova, a major figure of the Russian Enlightenment. Princess Dashkov came to Ireland and spent time with the family. Two of John Ryder's relations, Martha and Katherine Wilmot went to Russia to renew the friendship.

References

Attribution

1697 births
1775 deaths
People from Nuneaton
People from County Galway
People educated at Charterhouse School
Alumni of Queens' College, Cambridge
Fellows of Queens' College, Cambridge
Anglican bishops of Killaloe
Bishops of Down and Connor (Church of Ireland)
Anglican archbishops of Tuam
18th-century Anglican archbishops
Members of the Privy Council of Ireland
Members of the Irish House of Lords